Sands Films is a small British film production company, founded by 
producer Richard Goodwin and director Christine Edzard in the early 1970s, and based in Rotherhithe, London. The company is known for its production of costumes for period dramas.

Background
The building that Sands Films occupies is a former granary, now a grade II listed building. The business was founded in 1975 and since 1976, it has housed a small film stage, film theatre, picture library, workshops and costume stores. The Goodwins initially used the derelict building rent-free, on the basis they completely repaired and renovated the property.

As an independent film production studio Sands Films has its own soundproof stage, workshops, costume department, set construction workshop, cutting room, cinema and other services needed to make films. It is a self-sufficient and fully integrated production facility. Cinema and television companies as varied as Working Title, Talkback, BBC, Channel 4, Freemantle, Ridley Scott Associates, Sky TV, the Royal Opera House, the New York Metropolitan Opera and Canal+ have used the facilities at Sands Films for their projects. With the covid-19 lockdown the studio has intensified its live streaming activities.

Productions
Productions by Sands Films include Tales of Beatrix Potter (1971), Stories from a Flying Trunk (1976), The Nightingale (1981), Biddy (1982), Little Dorrit (1987), The Fool (1989), As You Like It (1991 film), Amhal and the Night Visitors (1996), The IMAX Nutcracker (1997) and The Children's Midsummer Night's Dream (2001).

The studio has been successful in delivering full production packages to companies in need of a London studio base, such as A Passage to India (1984) to Bright Star (2009). Sands Films was the production base for The Long Day Closes (film) for which all the sets were built. Sands Films supplied facilities to Working Title's productions of Anna Karenina (2012) and Les Miserables (2012).

Other productions the company has produced costumes include all the Agatha Christie films produced by EMI (including Death on the Nile), 
Vanity Fair (2004), The Phantom of the Opera (2004), Fingersmith (2005), and Pride & Prejudice (2005). It hand-embroidered the costumes for the main characters in the BBC's 2015 series Wolf Hall.

In 2011, the company's annual turnover exceeded £1 million for the first time. After its rent almost quadrupled since 2000 and it had been asked to pay back-rent for an unrenovated part of the building, the Goodwins began to raise funds to purchase the property. This included selling shares at £500 each, and later in 2012, they successfully bought the property, with plans to modernise its production facilities. Managing director Olivier Stockman has worked for Sands Studios since 1980.

In 2017, Sands Films began production of The Good Soldier Schwejck, written and directed by Christine Edzard and based on The Good Soldier Švejk by Jaroslav Hašek. The project partly was funded by the auction of a costume worn by Mark Rylance in the BBC's Wolf Hall.

References

External links
 Sands Films company website
 Londonist Discovers Rotherhithe Picture Research Library
 Knowledge of London Visits Sands Films and Rotherhithe Picture Research Library
 Sands Films at IMDb

British film studios
Film production companies of the United Kingdom
Rotherhithe